Joseph Anthony Greco (December 5, 1919 – September 16, 2006) was a member of the Wisconsin State Assembly.

Biography
Greco was born in Milwaukee, Wisconsin. During World War II, he served in the United States Army. Greco was Roman Catholic and was a member of the Society of the Holy Name. He graduated from Lawrence University and received his law degree from Marquette University Law School. He practiced law in Milwaukee.

Political career
Greco was a member of the Assembly from 1955 to 1960. He was a Democrat.

References

External links
The Political Graveyard
Joseph A. Greco's obituary

1919 births
2006 deaths
Politicians from Milwaukee
Catholics from Wisconsin
Lawrence University alumni
Marquette University Law School alumni
Wisconsin lawyers
Military personnel from Milwaukee
United States Army soldiers
United States Army personnel of World War II
Lawyers from Milwaukee
20th-century American politicians
20th-century American lawyers
Democratic Party members of the Wisconsin State Assembly